Talha Harith Amir (born 11 February 1989) or better known as Talha Harith (Jawi: تلها هاريث) is an actor from Malaysia.

Filmography

Drama

Television Movie
  Abangku Patriot (2015) TVi 
 Alim - Alim Kucing (2017) TV1

References

Living people
21st-century Malaysian male actors
Malaysian male television actors
1989 births
People from Johor
Malaysian Muslims
Malaysian people of Malay descent